Raven Row is a free art exhibition centre in Spitalfields.  It was constructed from numbers 56 and 58, Artillery Lane.  These properties were built about 1690.  The area was formerly used for testing artillery and this portion of the lane was known as Raven Row until 1895.  No. 56 and 58 had been rebuilt in the 1750s for use by Huguenot silk weavers and traders.  The buildings were converted into a gallery in 2009 by 6a architects on behalf of Alex Sainsbury, who established a charity to run it.  The inaugural exhibition was of work by New York artist Ray Johnson. Raven Row has held exhibitions by K.P. Brehmer, Iain Baxter, Adam Chodzko, Suzanne Treister, Peter Kennard, Hilary Lloyd, Harun Farocki, Eduardo Paolozzi, Stephen Willats and Yvonne Rainer. Other exhibitions have been curated by Richard Grayson, Lars Bang Larsen and Alice Motard.

Raven Row suspended its exhibition programming in 2017, with the intention to resume it in 2020 (subsequently delayed to 2021).  In the interim, the Artillery Lane building was used by non-profit groups and organisations including the gallery Piper Keys, Asia-Art-Activism Research Network, London Renters Union, and East London Cable.

References

External links
About Raven Row

Contemporary art galleries in London
Art galleries established in 2009
2009 establishments in England
Spitalfields